Shefat Isufi (born 22 January 1990), is a German professional boxer who held the WBF World light-heavyweight title from 16 April 2022. He previously held the WBO Inter-Continental Title in Super Middle Weight from 8 July 2017 to 18 May 2019.

Background
Isufi was born in Veliki Trnovac, Serbia, but in 2010 moved to Munich, Germany to continue his professional boxing career.

Professional career
Isufi made his professional debut on 10 April 2010, went his first 14 fights unbeaten until he lost to fellow German Dennis Ronert, but in his first three fights, two of them were draws.

On 29 December 2015 Isufi won the vacant International Boxing Federation East/West Europe Light heavyweight Title against Slavisa Simeunovic in Regensburg, Germany.

Right after the first title on 7 May 2016, Isufi won the vacant Pan Asian Boxing Association Light heavyweight Title against Giorgi Beroshvili with TKO in round 2  and defended that title again after three months on 20 August 2016 against Mikheil Khutsishvili in Alanya, Turkey.

Isufi started to compete to Super middleweight and on 8 July 2017 he won the vacant World Boxing Organization Inter-Continental Title against David Zegarra with Knockout in round 11. Isufi was able to defend the title twice, on 16 February 2018 against Rafael Sosa Pintos and on 21 July 2018 against Mohamed El Achi, both fights Isufi won with unanimous decision after 10 rounds.

From December 2018 to May 2019, Isufi was listed as a number 1 contender in the world  in WBO Super middleweight.

On 18 May 2019, Isufi made his first attempt at a world title, by challenging Billy Joe Saunders for a vacant World Title in Super middleweight who lost with unanimous decision after 12 rounds.

After winning the Interim German International (BDB) Light Heavyweight Title against Bosko Misic with TKO in round 3, Isufi fought Tomasz Adamek for WBF Intercontinental Light Heavyweight Title on 18 July 2021 and won the fight with unanimous decision after 10 rounds.

On 16 April 2022 Isufi won the vacant WBF World title when he out-scored Bulgarian Grigor Saruhanian after 12 rounds with unanimous decision. Isufi is still the WBF World Light Heavyweight champion after retaining his title against Canadian Ryan Ford, and after a close and entertaining encounter he emerged victorious by unanimous decision on 16 September 2022 at the Rudolf Weber Arena in Oberhausen, Germany.

Accomplishments 
 International Boxing Federation Youth Cruiser Champion 2014
 International Boxing Federation East/West Europe Light Heavyweight Champion 2015, 2016
 Pan Asian Boxing Association Light Heavyweight Champion 2016
 World Boxing Organization Inter-Continental Super Middleweight Champion 2017, 2018
 Interim German International (BDB) Light Heavy Title 2020
 World Boxing Federation Inter-Continental Light Heavyweight Champion 2021
 World Boxing Federation World Light Heavyweight Champion 2022

Professional boxing record

References

External links

Super-middleweight boxers
Light-heavyweight boxers
German people of Kosovan descent
Living people
German male boxers
Kosovan male boxers
International Boxing Organization champions
World Boxing Organization champions
World light-heavyweight boxing champions
1990 births